This is a list of wars involving the Democratic Socialist Republic of Sri Lanka and its predecessor states.

Early Sri Lanka

British Ceylon

Dominion of Ceylon

Democratic Socialist Republic of Sri Lanka

Sri Lankan peacekeeping

References

Sri Lanka
Wars
Wars